Cynthia II is the second studio album by freestyle musician Cynthia, released 1 July 1991 by the label Micmac Records. The singles from this album were "Dreamboy / Dreamgirl," a collaboration with singer Johnny O, which reached position # 53 on the Billboard Hot 100, and "Break Up to Make Up", which reached position # 70 on July 20, 1991 in the Billboard Hot 100.

Tracks

Performance on the charts
Singles - Billboard

References

1991 albums
Cynthia (singer) albums